Phetsommai Sor.Sommai is a Thai Muay Thai fighter.

Biography and career

Phetsommai was introduced to Muay Thai at 8 years old by his father. After only 20 days of training he started his career as Yokpetch Thanasaktransport and won his first nine fights. At 17 years old he moved to Bangkok to join the Sor.Sommai gym and changed his ring name to Phetsommai.

In 2018 Phetsommai became a prominent figure in the stadiums as he stayed undefeated for 9 fights over the course of a year and won the Channel 5 and Rajadamnern Stadium 112 lbs belts. He was on the short list for the "Fighter of the Year" award.

On August 9, 2019 Phetsommai went up in weight for a superfight of stadium champions against Lumpinee 115 lbs champion Rungnarai Kiatmuu9, Phetsommai suffered a knockdown in the third round and lost by decision.

Titles and accomplishments
Rajadamnern Stadium
 2018 Rajadamnern Stadium 112 lbs Champion
Siam Omnoi Stadium
 2019 Omnoi Stadium 115 lbs Champion
 2022 Omnoi Stadium 118 lbs Chmpion
Professional Boxing Association of Thailand (PAT)
 2021 Thailand (PAT) 118 lbs Champion
Channel 5
 2018 Channel 5 112 lbs Champion

Fight record

|-  style="background:#fbb;"
| 2023-02-14|| Loss ||align=left| Chalamdam NayokAthasala  || Muaymansananmuang Uthai || Uthai Thani province, Thailand || Decision || 5 || 3:00

|-  style="background:#fbb;"
| 2023-01-23|| Loss ||align=left| Yodsila Chor.Hapayak || Muay Thai Pantamit, Thupatemi Stadium || Pathum Thani, Thailand || Decision || 5 || 3:00

|-  style="background:#cfc;"
| 2022-12-10|| Win ||align=left| Jakdao Petchkiatpetch ||Suekjao Muaythai, Omnoi Stadum || Samut Sakhon, Thailand || Decision ||5 ||3:00 
|-  style="background:#fbb;"
| 2022-10-22|| Loss||align=left| Kumandoi PetchyindeeAcademy  || Ruamponkon Meepuen|| Samut Sakhon province, Thailand || KO (Left Hook) || 1 ||

|-  style="background:#cfc;"
| 2022-06-20 || Win ||align=left| Petchsila Wor.Auracha  || U-Muay RuamJaiKonRakMuayThai + Palangmai, Rajadamnern Stadium || Bangkok, Thailand || Decision || 5 || 3:00
|-  style="background:#cfc;"
| 2022-04-28|| Win ||align=left| Ittipon Singmawynn ||Suekjao Muaythai, Omnoi Stadum || Samut Sakhon, Thailand || Decision|| 5 ||3:00 
|-
! style=background:white colspan=9 |
|-  style="background:#cfc;"
| 2022-03-27|| Win ||align=left| Chokpanlan Por.Lakboon||Chang MuayThai Kiatpetch Amarin Super Fight, Rajadamnern Stadium || Bangkok, Thailand || Decision || 5 || 3:00 
|-  style="background:#cfc;"
| 2021-11-27|| Win ||align=left| Ittipon Singmawynn ||Suekjao Muaythai, Omnoi Stadum || Samut Sakhon, Thailand || Decision || 5 || 3:00
|-
! style=background:white colspan=9 |
|-  style="background:#fbb;"
| 2021-03-17|| Loss||align=left| Chokpanlan Por.Lakboon || Sor.Thanapon, Rajadamnern Stadium|| Bangkok, Thailand ||Decision ||5 ||3:00
|-  style="background:#fbb;"
| 2020-12-10|| Loss||align=left| Jomhod Eminentair|| Rajadamnern Stadium|| Bangkok, Thailand ||Decision ||5 ||3:00
|-  style="background:#fbb;"
| 2020-11-17|| Loss||align=left| Chokpanlan Por.Lakboon || Sor.Sommai, CentralPlaza Nakhon Ratchasima|| Nakhon Ratchasima, Thailand ||Decision ||5 ||3:00
|-  style="background:#fbb;"
| 2020-10-09|| Loss||align=left| Puenkon Tor.Surat  || True4U Muaymanwansuk, Rangsit Stadium || Rangsit, Thailand ||Decision ||5 ||3:00
|-  style="background:#cfc;"
| 2020-09-15|| Win||align=left| Chanalert Meenayothin  || Chef Boontham Birthday, Omnoi Stadium || Samut Sakhon, Thailand ||Decision ||5 ||3:00
|-  style="background:#cfc;"
| 2020-08-11|| Win||align=left| Phetsuphan Por.Daorungruang  || Chef Boontham, Thanakorn Stadium || Nakhon Pathom Province, Thailand ||Decision ||5 ||3:00
|-  style="background:#fbb;"
| 2020-07-11|| Loss ||align=left| Phetsomjit Jitmuangnon  || SuekJaoMuayThai Omnoi Stadium || Samut Sakhon, Thailand ||Decision ||5 ||3:00
|-  style="background:#cfc;"
| 2020-02-28|| Win||align=left| Phetsomjit Jitmuangnon  || Ruamponkonchon Pratan Super Fight || Pathum Thani, Thailand ||Decision ||5 ||3:00
|-  style="background:#fbb;"
| 2020-01-31|| Loss ||align=left| Rungnarai Kiatmuu9 || Phuket Super Fight Real Muay Thai || Mueang Phuket District, Thailand || Decision ||5 || 3:00
|-  style="background:#FFBBBB;"
| 2019-12-26|| Loss ||align=left| Satanmuanglek PetchyindeeAcademy || Rajadamnern Stadium ||Bangkok, Thailand || KO (Elbow) || 3 ||
|-  style="background:#FFBBBB;"
| 2019-11-25|| Loss ||align=left| Phetsomjit Jitmuangnon || Rajadamnern Stadium ||Bangkok, Thailand || Decision (Unanimous) || 5 || 3:00
|-
! style=background:white colspan=9 |
|-  style="background:#cfc;"
| 2019-10-12|| Win ||align=left| Phetsomjit Jitmuangnon || Omnoi Stadium ||Samut Sakhon, Thailand || Decision (Unanimous) || 5 || 3:00
|-
! style=background:white colspan=9 |
|-  style="background:#FFBBBB;"
| 2019-08-09|| Loss ||align=left| Rungnarai Kiatmuu9 || Lumpinee Stadium ||Bangkok, Thailand || Decision (Unanimous)|| 5 || 3:00
|-
! style=background:white colspan=9 |
|-  style="background:#CCFFCC;"
| 2019-07-04|| Win ||align=left| Den Sor.Phet-Udon || Rajadamnern Stadium ||Bangkok, Thailand || Decision || 5 || 3:00
|-
! style=background:white colspan=9 |
|-  style="background:#CCFFCC;"
| 2019-05-24|| Win ||align=left| Phetparin Sitnumnoi || Rajadamnern Stadium ||Bangkok, Thailand || KO (Left High Kick) || 2 ||
|-  style="background:#FFBBBB;"
| 2019-03-28|| Loss ||align=left| Phetsuphan Por.Daorungruang || Rajadamnern Stadium ||Bangkok, Thailand || Decision || 5 || 3:00
|-  style="background:#CCFFCC;"
| 2019-02-14|| Win ||align=left| Raktemroi Sor.Jor.Vichitpadriew || Rajadamnern Stadium ||Bangkok, Thailand || Decision || 5 || 3:00
|-  style="background:#CCFFCC;"
| 2019-01-08|| Win ||align=left| Raktemroi Sor.Jor.Vichitpadriew || Sor.Sommai RuamJaiMutitaKruAriyaChat ||Chiang Rai, Thailand || KO  || 4 ||
|-  style="background:#c5d2ea;"
| 2018-11-13|| Draw ||align=left| Kompetch Sitsarawatsuer || Lumpinee Stadium ||Bangkok, Thailand || Decision || 5 || 3:00
|-  style="background:#CCFFCC;"
| 2018-10-15|| Win ||align=left| Priewpak SorJor.Vichitpadriew || Rajadamnern Stadium ||Bangkok, Thailand || Decision || 5 || 3:00
|-  style="background:#CCFFCC;"
| 2018-09-07|| Win||align=left| Kompetch Sitsarawatsuer || Lumpinee Stadium ||Bangkok, Thailand || Decision || 5 || 3:00
|-  style="background:#CCFFCC;"
| 2018-08-08|| Win||align=left| Chokplerngrit Por.Lakboon || Rajadamnern Stadium ||Bangkok, Thailand || TKO (Referee Stoppage) || 4  || 
|-
! style=background:white colspan=9 |
|-  style="background:#CCFFCC;"
| 2018-04-23|| Win||align=left| Phetvichit Sor.Jor.Vichitpadriew || Rajadamnern Stadium ||Bangkok, Thailand || Decision || 5 || 3:00
|-  style="background:#CCFFCC;"
| 2018-03-26|| Win||align=left| Rit Jitmuangnon || Rajadamnern Stadium ||Bangkok, Thailand || Decision || 5 || 3:00
|-  style="background:#CCFFCC;"
| 2018-02-18|| Win||align=left| Pungtor Por.Lakboon || Rangsit Stadium ||Pathum Thani, Thailand || Decision || 5 || 3:00
|-
! style=background:white colspan=9 |
|-  style="background:#CCFFCC;"
| 2018-01-29|| Win||align=left| Deuan Kor.Kampanath || Rajadamnern Stadium ||Bangkok, Thailand || Decision || 5 || 3:00
|-  style="background:#FFBBBB;"
| 2017-11-28|| Loss ||align=left| Den Sor.Phet-Udon ||  ||Thailand || Decision || 5 || 3:00
|-  style="background:#FFBBBB;"
| 2017-09-27|| Loss ||align=left| KoKo Paeminburi || Lumpinee Stadium ||Bangkok, Thailand || Decision || 5 || 3:00
|-  style="background:#CCFFCC;"
| 2017-08-08|| Win ||align=left| KoKo Paeminburi || Lumpinee Stadium ||Bangkok, Thailand || Decision || 5 || 3:00
|-  style="background:#CCFFCC;"
| 2017-06-19|| Win ||align=left| Supernai Teeded99|| Lumpinee Stadium ||Bangkok, Thailand || KO || 3 ||
|-  style="background:#FFBBBB;"
| 2017-04-10|| Loss ||align=left| Chatploy Sor.Poonsawat || Rajadamnern Stadium ||Bangkok, Thailand || KO || 3 ||
|-  style="background:#CCFFCC;"
| 2017-03-09|| Win ||align=left| Supernai Teeded99|| Rajadamnern Stadium ||Bangkok, Thailand || Decision || 5 || 3:00
|-  style="background:#CCFFCC;"
| 2017-01-11|| Win ||align=left| Ritichai Sor.Kitichai || Rajadamnern Stadium ||Bangkok, Thailand || KO || 3 ||
|-  style="background:#CCFFCC;"
| 2016-12-08|| Win ||align=left| BinLaden ChiangKhong || Rajadamnern Stadium ||Bangkok, Thailand || Decision || 5 || 3:00
|-  style="background:#FFBBBB;"
| 2016-10-12|| Loss ||align=left| Kwangphet Muayhunumbangkadi  || Rajadamnern Stadium ||Bangkok, Thailand || Decision || 5 || 3:00
|-  style="background:#FFBBBB;"
| 2016-06-13|| Loss ||align=left| Phettamaew Sor.Sattra  || Rajadamnern Stadium ||Bangkok, Thailand || Decision || 5 || 3:00
|-  style="background:#CCFFCC;"
| 2015-12-03|| Win ||align=left| Phetniyom F.A.Group  || Rajadamnern Stadium ||Bangkok, Thailand || Decision || 5 || 3:00
|-  style="background:#FFBBBB;"
| 2015-08-13|| Loss ||align=left| Saoek Chaiwat|| Rajadamnern Stadium ||Bangkok, Thailand || Decision || 5 || 3:00
|-  style="background:#CCFFCC;"
| 2015-07-17|| Win ||align=left| Toto Tor.Thawat  || Lumpinee Stadium ||Bangkok, Thailand || KO || 3 ||
|-  style="background:#CCFFCC;"
| 2015-06-15|| Win ||align=left| Chokvittaya Pumpanmuang  || Rajadamnern Stadium ||Bangkok, Thailand || Decision || 5 || 3:00
|-  style="background:#FFBBBB;"
| 2014-12-28|| Loss ||align=left| Narongdej A.Wanchet|| Rajadamnern Stadium ||Bangkok, Thailand || Decision || 5 || 3:00
|-  style="background:#FFBBBB;"
| 2014-12-04|| Loss ||align=left| Chatploy Sor.Poonsawat || Rajadamnern Stadium ||Bangkok, Thailand || Decision || 5 || 3:00
|-  style="background:#CCFFCC;"
| 2014-09-08|| Win||align=left| Rungpetch JSP || Rajadamnern Stadium ||Bangkok, Thailand || KO || 4 || 
|-
| colspan=9 | Legend:

References

Phetsommai Sor.Sommai
Living people
1997 births
Phetsommai Sor.Sommai